The TAC-37 is a top break launcher of 37mm munitions made by the American company Ordnance Group LLC of Sarasota, Florida. The longer versions are typically used by law enforcement and civilian hobbyists. A Picatinny Rail, that extends over the length of the barrel, accommodates a variety of sighting and illumination accessories.

Recent use of these weapons has been as devices to non-lethally "stand off" pirates near the African Coast.  Civilian use include Fourth of July celebrations, airport runway safety (the noise scares off birds) and whale hunting protest.

A major benefit, compared to 40mm launchers, of this system is that it requires no licensing (and therefore no paperwork) for any level of US government.  This makes it a relatively easy purchase for police and other first responders.

Typical rounds used by civilians with this launcher include:

 flares
 smoke rounds
 noise effect rounds (with limited detonating explosive)

To avoid classification as "destructive devices" under BATF regulations, rounds possessed with 37 mm launchers must not be anti-personnel.  To possess these one must get a tax stamp and undergo investigation by BATF.  Further, local and State laws might preclude such ownership.  The specific wording of the BATF rule is:

ATF Ruling 95-3: "37/38 mm gas/flare guns possessed with cartridges containing wood pellets, rubber pellets or balls, or bean bags are classified as destructive devices for purposes of the Gun Control Act, 18 U.S.C. Chapter 44, and the National Firearms Act, 26 U.S.C. Chapter 53."

The type of rounds that are restricted include casings loaded with rubber pellets, or batons.  These are available through various distributors of ammunition products who, as a rule, will not sell to civilians.

See also 
 ARWEN ACE
 Milkor Stopper

External links

 37mm.com
 BatesandDittus.com

References

Riot guns
Flare guns